The Lord of Steel is the eleventh studio album of the American heavy metal band Manowar. It was first released as a download on June 16, 2012 and the limited-edition pre-release special edition CD of the British heavy metal magazine Metal Hammer on June 26, 2012. The retail edition of the album featured different mixes and mastering, spectacular new art by fantasy artist Ken Kelly, and other surprises. 
The album was available as CD, limited-edition vinyl and digital album. It featured cover art by Ken Kelly who has worked on many previous Manowar covers. It marks a change in the band's sound, moving away from the symphonic sound of Gods of War and going back to the style of Louder than Hell with the production quality of Thunder in the Sky.

The song "El Gringo" was used in the credits of the 2011 film of the same name.

Track listing 

 The Hammer Edition is the CD version that came in the Metal Hammer's 100% Official Steel Edition bundle (including this CD, the HolyHell's "Darkness Visible (The Warning)" EP and the magazine Metal Hammer #233) exclusively from Metal Hammer UK. Also available as digital download released on Manowar webshop. It includes a 16-page digital booklet featuring complete lyrics and brand new band photos.

 The Retail Edition, originally scheduled for September 28, hit the stores on October 19, 2012 on CD, limited-edition picture vinyl and as digital album. It features a 24-page booklet, an opulent new illustration by fantasy artist Ken Kelly, a brand new song titled The Kingdom Of Steel, entirely different mixes and many new arrangements compared to the limited pre-release.

Personnel
Manowar
Eric Adams – vocals
Karl Logan – guitars, keyboards
Joey DeMaio – 4 string, 8 string bass, piccolo bass, keyboards
Donnie Hamzik – drums, percussion
Guest/session musicians
Joe Rozler – keyboards
Francisco Palomo – keyboards on El Gringo
Technical stuff
Joey DeMaio – engineering, recording, editing, production
Ronald Prent – mixing (at Wisseloord Studios)
Darcy Proper – mastering (at Wisseloord Studios)
Dirk Kloiber – additional engineering and editing (at Haus Wahnfried)
Francisco Palomo – additional editing

Charts

References

External links

2012 albums
Manowar albums
Albums with cover art by Ken Kelly (artist)